Buffalo, also known as Buffaloes, Dumbarton Bridge: Buffaloes, and Q Street Buffalo, is a series of monumental sculptures of buffalo by Alexander Phimister Proctor. Four of them are installed at the Dumbarton Bridge in Washington, D.C., in the United States.

See also
 List of public art in Washington, D.C., Ward 2

References

External links

 
 Buffalo, Metropolitan Museum of Art
 Buffalo (Model of the Q Street Bridge Buffalo in Washington, D.C.), 1912, Cleveland Museum of Art

Animal sculptures in Washington, D.C.
Bison in art
Northwest (Washington, D.C.)
Outdoor sculptures in Washington, D.C.
Sculptures by Alexander Phimister Proctor